"I of Newton" is the second segment of the twelfth episode from the first season (1985–86) of the television series The Twilight Zone. The teleplay was based on a short story by Joe Haldeman which first appeared in the June 1970 issue of Fantastic Stories magazine (Volume 19, no. 5). It is a play on the deal with the Devil motif, in which a mathematician completely involuntarily makes a pact to sell his soul and must win a battle of wits with a demon in order to get out of it.

Plot
Sam is a college professor frustrated at his multiple failures to solve a complex mathematical equation, angrily exclaiming, "I'd sell my soul to get this thing right!" A demon appears and says that despite being an idle remark in a conditional mood, Sam's statement still constitutes a binding contract. He intends to sell Sam's soul to otherworldly bidders.

The demon says the terms are as follows: Sam is permitted to ask three questions about how the process works or of demonic powers. Sam then may ask a fourth question or make a request of the demon. If the demon fails to perform the task or to answer the question, the deal is off and Sam's soul is spared. When Sam incredulously says "Really?" the demon responds "Yes, really," using up Sam's first question.

Sam asks if there are any physical limitations to the demon's powers, and for his third question, if there is any place from which the demon cannot find his way back. The demon denies any limitation in either regard. The demon says his powers are so great that he can see the world in ways such as "Rome if Alexander the Great lived to a ripe old age" or "Berlin if the Nazis won". Sam then delivers the demon's task: "Get lost." Realizing too late that if he could not return that it meant defeat, the demon screams and melts away, leaving only his sunglasses. Sam throws them away and turns back to his math problem with a rueful smile, noting, "Well, that guy wasn't any help at all."

Closing narration

Differences from original short story
In the original short story, the exclamation that is tacked onto a string of math to summon the demon is "no, goddammit". The writer of the teleplay, Alan Brennert, devised the demon's screen characterization as a sort of demonic Hollywood agent who wants to sell Sam's soul. In the short story, the demon plans to eat Sam's soul rather than sell it; he observes, "Unfortunately the loss of your soul will drop your intelligence to that of a vegetable — I am also a vegetarian." When the demon has been banished (his final words being "You and Ernest Hemingway!"), Sam plays with the Fermat's Theorem disproof fragment the demon left behind and thinks about summoning the demon and tricking him again. The final sentence is fashioned after Aesop and suggests that if there was a devil there must also be a God, "watching his language."

See also
Omnipotence paradox

References

External links
 

1985 American television episodes
The Twilight Zone (1985 TV series season 1) episodes
Fiction about the Devil
Television episodes about demons
Television shows based on short fiction

fr:Mon âme au diable